Jonathan Mark Woodward (born November 20, 1973) is an American actor. He is the younger of two sons of an architect and a literacy teacher. He is a graduate of New York University at the Experimental Theatre Wing, 1998.

He performed with Big Dance Company at Dance Theater Workshop, HERE Arts Center and the Viewpoints Conference in New York as well as the Exit and Via Festivals in France and the Polverigi Festival in Italy.

He also appeared as Dr. Jason Posner in the 2001 film Wit, which was based on the play of the same name written by Margaret Edson.

Woodward is one several actors to have crossed over onto three series created by Joss Whedon: Buffy the Vampire Slayer, Angel, and Firefly. He appeared as Holden Webster in the Buffy the Vampire Slayer episode "Conversations with Dead People", as Knox in the fourth and fifth seasons of the series Angel, and as Tracey in the Firefly episode "The Message". All three characters appear friendly or helpful when first introduced, but each is eventually killed by the series' protagonists when revealed to be more sinister. In addition, all three characters appear in connection with a grave or coffin of some sort. In 2010 he starred in the film Drones directed by Buffy alums Amber Benson and Adam Busch.

External links 
 
 Jonathan M Woodward Network

1973 births
Living people
Male actors from Idaho
People from Moscow, Idaho